is a term coined by Akio Mori referring to human brains affected by the long-term effect of playing video games. Mori, a professor in the Humanities and Sciences division of Nihon University in Japan, originally coined the term and presented the concept in his 2002 book . It has been criticized by neuroscientists as pseudoscientific.

Summary

Mori performed an experiment at Tokyo's Nihon University designed to measure the effect of video games on human brain activity by examining beta waves, which are produced during Beta statesthe states associated with normalwaking consciousness. Mori claims his study has revealed that people who spend long periods playing video games have less activity in the brain's pre-frontal region, which governs emotion and creativity, in contrast to  their  peers. He claims that the experiment demonstrates the existence of an "adverse effect that video games have on the human brain". Specifically, Mori asserts that side effects can include loss of concentration, an inability to control temper and problems socializing or associating with others. Game brain refers to these effects and the state of the brain.

His theory has gained some recognition in popular culture, especially among parents who believe that video gaming can have detrimental effects on child development. It has in many instances affected local policy and decision-making regarding the selling of games to minors. Often, when cases of juvenile delinquency and child misbehaviour are suspected to be a result of over-exposure to video games, Japanese media will show game brain as a possible explanation. Mori insisted that use of the internet was the cause of the Sasebo slashing.

Criticism
Mori's theory was criticized as unwarranted research by established neuroscientists and brain specialists, because he used unreliable measures and misinterpreted the fluctuation of beta waves. One of his critics, Dennis Schutter, a neuroscientist specialising in the EEG signatures of different emotional states has stated, "My guess is that fatigue is the most likely cause of the absence of the beta waves and not the gaming per se."

Ryuta Kawashima later developed the game Brain Age: Train Your Brain in Minutes a Day! Kawashima claimed that Game Brain was "superstition". Mori's theory focused on video games, but he did not determine any particular kind. There are controversies over violent video games over the world, but his theory is limited to Japan. Professor Akira Baba of the graduate school of the University of Tokyo pointed out that even shogi player Yoshiharu Habu probably has Game Brain under his theory.

Although Mori's theory is cited as pseudoscience, it became popular with some in Japan. Nevertheless, it faced criticism, with Japanese neuroscientist Tadaharu Tsumoto stating in 2006 to disregard it.

See also 
 Video game controversy

References

Further reading 
Kayama, Rika; Mori Ken (2004) Net Ōji to Kētai Hime (ネット王子とケータイ姫, lit. "Internet Prince And Mobile Phone Princess") (Chuokoron-Shinsha) 
Kubota, Kisou (2006) Baka wa Naoseru (バカはなおせる, lit. "Idiot Can Be Cured") (ASCII) 
Ikeuchi, Ryō (2008) Giji Kagaku Nyūmon (疑似科学入門, lit. "Pseudoscience Approach") (Iwanami Shoten, Publishers)

External links
"Video games dulling the brain?", GameSpot, July 9, 2002
"Video games may lower brain activity: researcher", Associated Newspapers of Ceylon Limited, July 9, 2002
"Computer games 'make you moody'", CBBC (BBC), July 10, 2002
"Video games cause irritability: study", The Age, July 11, 2002
"Video game "brain damage" claim criticised", New Scientist, July 11, 2002
"Beta beware 'game brain'", The Japan Times, September 29, 2002
"Ergonomic evaluation of portable videogame software (PDF)", at Digital Games Research Association

Pseudoscience
2000s neologisms
2002 neologisms